El Tiempo es Oro (Time Is Gold) is the third studio album by Mexican pop singer Paulina Rubio, released simultaneously on 21 March 1995 by EMI Mexico in 18 countries. It was recorded in the autumn and winter of 1994 in Madrid, Spain and Miami, Florida. Similar to her previous studio albums, Miguel Blasco was the primary producer, but featured new producers and collaborations including Marco Flores, Adrián Posse and Claudio Bermúdez. At the age of twenty-three at the time, Rubio started to become creative and more involved in the process of creating and arranging the project compared to her two previous efforts, resulting in the album directing her to a new path in her music career, with a more bold image and a more dance-influenced sound, reflection of her lead single. El Tiempo Es Oro deals with many subjects about love including relationships, passion, crushes, cheating, disappointment, and happiness.

The album spawned four singles. "Te Daría Mi Vida" became one of Rubio's biggest successes with the EMI Music label, charting inside the top ten in Latin America and selling more than 140,000 copies in Mexico and the United States combined. The music video was an output of her "girl in love", showing an image of Rubio funniest and spontaneous. The album had a fleeting promotion in Spain and is considered by many to be a definitive turning point in Rubio's career, noted for beginning her international pop singing career.

The following singles—"Nada De Ti", and "Hoy Te Dejé De Amar"—all peaked inside the top 10 in Mexico. The last single, "Bésame En La Boca", was released to promotion for the film of the same name, which Rubio also starred in. The singer further promoted the album with a show, traveling to South America. The album was re-issued in Spain in 2001 by Virgin Records.

Background
Rubio's third album was produced again by the Spanish producer Miguel Blasco. It included for the first time, a conception by Rubio, who later said: "[El Tiempo Es Oro] talk about what I am, what I represent for people and also open my heart". The album presented a more stylish and contemporary dance sound.

Composition
El Tiempo Es Oro is a pop record. The second track, "Te Daría Mi Vida" is a dance-pop song in the europop style.

Promotion
Rubio promoted the album during 1995 and 1996 by performing a series of concerts. These events took place in Latin American countries such as Mexico and Costa Rica and in American and Mexican television programs such as En Vivo, Siempre en Domingo and Sábado Gigante. Rubio traveled to South America during July 1995 and performed in clubs as El Divino of Colombia, where she sang the album's singles.

With 'El Tiempo Es Oro', Paulina Rubio had the opportunity to perform for the first time in Spain. Her first performance was in February 1996 during the Carnival of Santa Cruz de Tenerife, where she performed some of her hits including "Te Daría Mi Vida" and "Nada De Ti". A month before performing at the Tenerife Festival, the singer had appeared in different magazines in Spain, where she was shown as the girlfriend of architect and socialite Ricardo Bofill Jr.

Singles
The album's lead single "Te Daría Mi Vida" was released in January 1995. Many critics noted Rubio's new style, different from her previous music. The song was successful on the charts of countries including Argentina and Mexico. The music video was directed by Carlos Marcovich and was filmed in Estudios Churubusco in Mexico. The album's second single "Nada De Ti" was released in May 1995. The song peaked inside the top ten in Argentina, Colombia, and Mexico.

A third single, "Hoy Te Dejé De Amar", was released in June 1995. The song was a success at radio airplay and fans have consistently said it's one of their favorite ballads of the EMI era. "Bésame En La Boca" had less success than her previous singles. It was included in the soundtrack of the film of the same name, in which Rubio also starred. "Amarnos No Es Pecado" was released as a radio single; the pop rock song was acclaimed as one of Rubio's best works on El Tiempo Es Oro.

Critical reception

Upon its release, El Tiempo Es Oro received mixed reviews from most music critics. The album was acclaimed for its musically production. In its launch review, El Semanario de México denoted the "rhythmic and danceable" vibe on the album, and noted that Rubio follows "the same line that has characterized her since 1991", referring to the concept of 'Golden Girl'. In the book El Huracán Mexicano, Paulina Rubio argued El Tiempo Es Oro is the final chapter to complete the "gold trilogy",  after La Chica Dorada (1992) and 24 Kilates (1993), constituting Rubio's projects as "Golden Girl", and all produced by Miguel Blasco. Some years later, AllMusic rated the album 2 out of 5 stars, a rating similar to that given to Rubino's prior album 24 Kilates.

Commercial performance
The album sold 100,000 copies in Mexico alone.

Track listing

Personnel
The following people contributed to El Tiempo Es Oro:

Sales

Release history

See also
1995 in Latin music

References

Bibliography

External links

1995 albums
Paulina Rubio albums
EMI Latin albums
Virgin Records albums